Jason Richardson (born August 19, 1974) is an American former professional BMX racer. He won the 1994 UCI BMX World Championships in the Superclass Cruiser category in Waterford Oaks, Michigan. In 2007 he won the gold medal in the elite men's category at the 2007 Pan American Games. He retired from racing in 2008 and finished his doctorate in 2011 to work with athletes and professionals as a Doctor in Psychology.

References

External links 
 

1974 births
Living people
American male cyclists
BMX riders
UCI BMX World Champions (elite men)
Pan American Games gold medalists for the United States
Pan American Games medalists in cycling
Cyclists at the 2007 Pan American Games
Medalists at the 2007 Pan American Games
Sportspeople from Newark, New Jersey